Damien A. Richardson (born April 3, 1976) is a former safety in the National Football League. He played his entire career for the Carolina Panthers from 1998–2004. He played college football at Arizona State.

While playing at Arizona State, Richardson received a Woody Hayes National Scholar-Athlete Award. He was also honored as a National Football Foundation Hall Scholar-Athlete, and was a GTE Academic All-District VIII selection. As a senior in 1997, Richardson was a Second-team All-Pac-10 member. 

Richardson's career with the Panthers was ended by serious injuries to his neck and knee. He subsequently attended medical school, completed a master's degree in public health at Harvard University, and is an orthopedic physician at Banner – University Medical Center.

References

1976 births
Living people
Players of American football from Los Angeles
American football safeties
Arizona State Sun Devils football players
Carolina Panthers players
Harvard School of Public Health alumni
American physicians